Lottie Ryan (born 15 October 1985) is an Irish television and radio presenter with Raidió Teilifís Éireann (RTÉ), Ireland's national radio and television station.

She is a daughter of the broadcaster Gerry Ryan. She studied media and television in college for five years before moving to New York City where she worked for CBS on The Good Wife. Several radio stations, including Radio Nova 100FM, have requested her to go on air as a DJ.

She does the entertainment on RTÉ 2fm across weekdays and presented the national breakfast show Breakfast Republic in 2018 and 2019.

Ryan won the fourth season of the Irish edition of Dancing with the Stars in 2020.

References

1985 births
Living people
Irish female dancers
Irish women radio presenters
Irish women television presenters
Radio personalities from the Republic of Ireland
Television presenters from the Republic of Ireland
Dancers from Dublin (city)
Mass media people from Dublin (city)